Roberto Massaro (born 26 July 1983) is an Italian footballer who plays as a forward.

Career
Born in Brindisi, southern Italy, Massaro started his professional career at AC Fiorentina of Florence. He played his only match at Serie A on 10 June 2001. After the bankrupt of La Viola, he joined Parma AC in August 2002. In summer 2003 he was included in a 6-men swap, which Massaro (for €2M), Filippo Porcari and Luca Ferretti of Parma swap for Davide Favaro, Marco Donadel (for €2M), and Mirko Stefani of Milan, all in co-ownership deal. He then spent 4 seasons on loan to clubs in Serie B, Serie C1 and Serie C2.

In June 2007, Milan got full registration rights for another €90,000, but Massaro then transferred to Varese. Since January 2008 he played for Olbia, but just played once. In June 2008 Olbia signed him on a free transfer.

References

External links
 San Marino Calcio Profile  
 Football.it Profile 
 FIGC 

Italian footballers
Italy youth international footballers
ACF Fiorentina players
Parma Calcio 1913 players
Como 1907 players
U.S. Salernitana 1919 players
A.C. Ancona players
U.S. Triestina Calcio 1918 players
Olbia Calcio 1905 players
F.C. Pavia players
S.S.D. Varese Calcio players
A.S.D. Victor San Marino players
Serie A players
Serie B players
Serie C players
Association football forwards
People from Brindisi
1983 births
Living people
Footballers from Apulia
Sportspeople from the Province of Brindisi